The Mitsubishi Ki-57 was a Japanese passenger transport aircraft, developed from the Ki-21 bomber, during the early 1940s.

Development

In 1938, when the Ki-21 heavy bomber began to enter service with the Imperial Japanese Army, its capability attracted the attention of the Imperial Japanese Airways. In consequence a civil version was developed and this, generally similar to the Ki-21-I and retaining its powerplant of two 708 kW (950 hp) Nakajima Ha-5 KAI radial engines, differed primarily by having the same wings transferred from a mid to low-wing configuration and the incorporation of a new fuselage to provide accommodation for up to 11 passengers. This transport version appealed also the navy, and following the flight of a prototype in August 1940 and subsequent testing, the type was ordered into production for both civil and military use.

This initial production Ki-57-I had the civil and military designations of MC-20-I and Army Type 100 Transport Model 1, respectively. A total of 100 production Ki-57-Is had been built by early 1942, and small numbers of them were transferred for use by the Japanese navy in a transport role, then becoming redesignated L4M1. After the last of the Ki-57s had been delivered production was switched to an improved Ki-57-II, which introduced more powerful 805 kW (1,080 hp) Mitsubishi Ha-l02 14-cylinder radial engines installed in redesigned nacelles and, at the same time, incorporated a number of detail refinements and minor equipment changes. Civil and military designations of this version were the MC-20-II and Army Type 100 Transport Model 2, respectively. Only 406 were built before production ended in January 1945. Both versions were covered by the Allied reporting name "Topsy".

Variants

Ki-57-I Army Type 100 Transport Model 1: Powered by two  Nakajima Ha5 KAI radial engines and a redesigned fuselage to accommodate 11 passengers. About 100 aircraft of this type were built including the civil version.
MC-20-I: Same as above but built for civil use with Imperial Japanese Airways (Dai Nippon Koku KK).
Ki-57-II Army Type 100 Transport Model 2:Powered by two  Mitsubishi Ha-102 Zuisei 14-cylinder radial engines installed in redesigned nacelles. Minor equipment and detail refinements were also incorporated. 306 aircraft of this type were produced before the end of production in January 1945.
MC-20-II: Same as above but built for civil use with Imperial Japanese Airways (Dai Nippon Koku KK).
L4M1: A small number of Ki-57-Is were transferred for test by the Japanese navy as transports and were redesignated L4M1.

Operators

Wartime
Military operators

 Imperial Japanese Army Air Force
 Imperial Japanese Navy Air Service

 Manchukuo Imperial Air Force

Civil operators

 Imperial Japanese Airways (Dai Nippon Koku KK)
 Asahi Shimbun
 Osaka Mainichi Shimbun
 Tyuka Koku Kaisya (in China)

 Manchukuo National Airways (in Manchuria)

 Reorganized National Government of China
 One MC-20 used as presidential transport

 One MC-20 used as presidential transport

Post-war

 The last Ki-57 was used as a trainer and retired in 1952.

 Imperial Japanese Airways (till October 1945)

 Captured aircraft, used by the KNIL.

Accidents and incidents
 On December 20, 1940, an Imperial Japanese Airways MC-20-I (J-BGON, Myuko) crashed into Tokyo Bay off Chiba during CAB's test flight, killing all 13 on board including 8 CAB inspectors.
 On June 21, 1941, a Manchurian Air Transport MC-20 (M-604) crashed into the Sea of Japan, killing all 18 on board.

Specifications (Ki-57-II)

See also

References

Bibliography

 Francillon, Ph.D., René J. The Mitsubishi Ki-21 (Aircraft in Profile number 172). Leatherhead, Surrey, UK: Profile Publications Ltd., 1967.
  (new edition 1987 by Putnam Aeronautical Books); 3rd edition 1987 by Putnam Aeronautical Books, 1987. ).

External links

 Classic Airplane Museum MC-20 Japanese
 JCAL MC-20  Japanese

Ki-057
1940s Japanese military transport aircraft
Low-wing aircraft
Ki-57, Mitsubishi
Aircraft first flown in 1940
Twin piston-engined tractor aircraft